"Dreamwork", is a single by South African rapper AKA, it features guest appearance from Yanga with production from Los Angeles based producer KJ Conteh. The single was released on 22 April 2016 through Vth Season under exclusive license from SME Africa.

In 2019 the single hit over 1 700 000 units, and over 2 000 000 stream and was certified 5× Diamond by the Recording Industry of South Africa (RiSA) making the rapper the first South African artist to reach the Diamond status. The very same night at a private dinner in Bryanston, Johannesburg it was announced that his single "One Time" was also certified Diamond, and "Caiphus song" and "The World Is Yours" (from a Platinum studio album Touch My Blood) were certified 8× Platinum, the rapper celebrated his success with a tweet posing with the plaques.

Awards and nominations

Certification and sales

References

External links 
 

2016 singles
2016 songs
AKA (rapper)
AKA (rapper) songs